Khalifa or Khalifah (Arabic: خليفة) is a name or title which means "successor", "ruler" or "leader". It most commonly refers to the leader of a Caliphate, but is also used as a title among various Islamic religious groups and others. Khalifa is sometimes also pronounced as "kalifa". There were four khalifas after Muhammad died, beginning with Abu Bakr.  The Khilaafat (or Caliphate)  was then contested and gave rise to the eventual division of the Islamic Umma into two groups, the Sunni and the Shi'a who interpret the word Khalifa in differently nuanced ways.

The earliest Islamic uses include 'Khaleefa(ḥ)' in The Qur'an, 2:30, where Allah commands the angels to bow down to Adam which more clearly guides to the root Classical Arabic meaning of the word as "Vicegerent", or divinely connected representative of Allah in the human form as a mercy to mankind.  See also how this meaning interacts with the word, Shirk (associating a partner or partners to Allah) by (for example) bowing down to them (in this case, Adam) with reverence.  "Vicegerent", therefore, is more at "divinely-guided spokesman" than "deputy" in this context and leads to the discovery of the role of Imam in Islam, from the Shi'i or Shi'a point of view where, it is claimed, the spiritual Khilaafat or designation of Khaleefa in this meaning of spiritual and temporal guide falls upon the first Imam, 'Ali ibn Abi Talib, "the favourite" (who received his mission from his cousin Muhammed himself but who also conceded the Khilaafat to the election and claim of the politically more powerful and more popular leader and his senior, Abu Bakr).  In the Shi'i tradition, however, the dissolved claim to the Khilaafat by Shi'i thereafter crystallised into Imamat which continued with his descendants after him through appointment by nass, or designation).

Living people with Khalifa as a name
 Khalifa Haftar (born 1943), Libyan military commander
 Hamad bin Khalifa Al Thani (born 1952), former Emir of Qatar
 Haya Rashed Al-Khalifa (born 1952), President of the 61st United Nations General Assembly
 Marcel Khalife (born 1950), Lebanese musician
 Peter Khalife (born 1990), Lebanese football agent
 Omer Khalifa (born 1956), Sudanese sportsman
 Rafik Khalifa (born 1966), Algerian billionaire
 Osama Khalifa (born 1995), Egyptian squash player
 Sam Khalifa (born 1963), American baseball-player

Historical people

 Khalifa ibn Khayyat (c. 777 – c. 854), Arab historian
 Khalifa Keita, fourth mansa of the Mali Empire
 Katip Çelebi, or Hajji Khalifa, (1599–1658), Ottoman-Turkish author
 Khalifa Cohen (d. 1932), Tunisian rabbi
 Abdallahi ibn Muhammad (1846–1899), known as "The Khalifa", Sudanese Mahdist leader
 Khalifa bin Harub of Zanzibar (1879–1960), sultan of Zanzibar
 Sirr Al-Khatim Al-Khalifa (1919–2006), Sudanese politician
 Khalifa bin Hamad Al Thani (1932–2016), Emir of Qatar
 Rashad Khalifa (1935–1990), Egyptian biochemist
 Khalifa bin Zayed Al Nahyan (1948–2022), Emir of Abu Dhabi and UAE president
 Mohammed Jamal Khalifa (1957–2007), Saudi Arabian businessman

Khalifa dynasty

 Isa bin Salman Al Khalifa
 Hamad bin Isa Al Khalifa, King of Bahrain
 Meriam Al Khalifa

See also 
 Amir or Emir
 Bey
 Baig or Begh
 Imam
 Kalifa (disambiguation)
 Khan (title)
 Malik
 Mir (title), itself used in various compounds
 Mirza, literally "son of an Emir"
 Murabitun World Movement
 Pontifical and Promethean man
 Prince
 Rana (title)
 Sheikh
 Sayyid
 Shah
 Sultan
 Vizier

References